"Drama!" is the first single released from English synth-pop duo Erasure's fourth studio album, Wild! (1989). Written by Vince Clarke and Andy Bell, the synthpop song begins with a low-key keyboard line and a subdued vocal from Bell. As the song progresses, the instrumentation and vocals become more hectic, ultimately ending as a full-blown dance track. "Drama!" contains a "Guilty!" exclamation throughout, provided by Scottish band the Jesus and Mary Chain, who were recording in the studio next door. The song was met with critical acclaim from both music critics and fans.

"Drama!" was issued by Mute Records in the UK and Sire Records in the United States. The B-side, "Sweet Sweet Baby" contains a vocal sample from the 1968 Jane Fonda film Barbarella.

Chart performance
Released prior to Wild!, "Drama!" continued Erasure's streak of hits on the UK Singles Chart, peaking at number four. The single also fared well in Denmark, where it reached number three and in West Germany, where it hit number 12. "Drama!" did not continue Erasure's chart success in the United States, where it failed to enter the Billboard Hot 100. It did, however, climb to number 10 on the Billboard Hot Dance Music/Club Play chart.

Critical reception
Ned Raggett from AllMusic remarked that "Drama!" "has a slightly hysterical tone to it, but its strong dancefloor surge and weirdly droning backing Bell harmonies help make it another winner." The Daily Vault's Michael R. Smith found that it is "the fastest song Erasure has ever recorded, beginning with a thunderclap and building to an exciting climax, all made even greater by the video that was made for it." He added, "Only Andy Bell can handle a mouthful lyric like "one psychological drama after another" and make it mean something." Chris Gerard from Metro Weekly complimented it as "a killer dance track with some great keyboard riffs, Bell's vocal is outstanding, and melodically and lyrically it's unforgettable." 

David Giles from Music Week named it "their best single yet", noting that Clarke "cranks up the tempo to almost Hi-NRG frenzy point." He concluded, "Where some of Erasure's earlier work has sounded a little complacent, this really goes for the jugular with Andy Bell in as fine voice as ever." Richard Lowe from Smash Hits felt "Drama" is "woefully predictable." Christopher Smith from Talk About Pop Music wrote that "with a clang of a bell, we are summoned back into the church of Erasure and treated to a quintessential piece of late 80's electro-pop perfection that builds and builds to its exciting climax."

Music video
The single was promoted with a music video showing Erasure performing the song in an alley into which plastic bags and bottles are blown by the wind, followed by larger plastic items falling from above. As the items begin to fill up the alley, Clarke and Bell initially escape onto a rooftop, but are ultimately engulfed by the rising tide of plastic.

Track listings

 7-inch and cassette single (MUTE89; CMUTE89)
 "Drama!"
 "Sweet Sweet Baby"

 12-inch and CD single (12MUTE89; CDMUTE89)
 "Drama!" (Act 2)
 "Sweet Sweet Baby" (The Moo-Moo Mix)
 "Paradise"

 Limited-edition 12-inch and CD single (L12MUTE89; LCDMUTE89)
 "Drama!" (Krucial Mix)
 "Sweet Sweet Baby" (Medi Mix)
 "Paradise" (Lost and Found Mix)

 US maxi-single (21356-2)
 "Drama!" (Krucial Mix)
 "Drama!" (7-inch version)
 "Sweet Sweet Baby" (Medi Mix)
 "Paradise" (Lost and Found Mix)
 "Drama!" (Act 2)
 "Sweet Sweet Baby" (The Moo-Moo Mix)
 "Paradise"
 "Sweet Sweet Baby" (7-inch mix)

Charts

Weekly charts

Year-end charts

References

Erasure songs
1989 singles
1989 songs
Mute Records singles
Sire Records singles
Song recordings produced by Gareth Jones
Song recordings produced by Mark Saunders
Songs written by Andy Bell (singer)
Songs written by Vince Clarke
UK Independent Singles Chart number-one singles